Tazti is a speech recognition software package developed and sold by Voice Tech Group, Inc. for Windows personal computers. The most recent package is version 3.2, which supports Windows 10, Windows 8.1, Windows 8 and Windows 7 64-bit editions. Earlier versions of Tazti supported Windows Vista and Windows XP. PC video game play by voice, controlling PC applications and programs by voice and creating speech commands to trigger a browser to open web pages, or trigger the Windows operating system to open files, folders or programs are Tazti's primary features. Earlier versions of Tazti included a lite Dictation feature that is eliminated from the latest version.

Features
Tazti Speech Recognition software has four primary areas of functionality: 
 Play PC games by voice,
 Control PC based applications and programs by voice, 
 Open files, folders and webpages by creating custom speech commands and associating them to file, folder or web URL.
 Run programs that include command line parameters which may include batch flies to mash up Tazti to robots, robotics, web apps, or desktop or other programs not a part of Tazti.

Tazti utilizes a minimal user interface. As an example, user spoken speech commands appear in a balloon on the user interface dashboard as they are spoken allowing the user to confirm by sight the speech recognition quality.

History
Voice Tech Group, Inc. was founded in 2005 as an Ohio corporation primarily concerned with the research of semantic search and voice search. Voice Tech Group, Inc. released Tazti Speech Recognition 1.0 as their first multi-feature speech recognition product in 2005. Early features include mashing up bookmarks and favorites to speech commands, website navigation by voice including of social media sites such as Facebook and Myspace, and voice control of iTunes. Voice Tech Group, Inc partnered with SR Tech Group LLC to develop speech and voice recognition technologies in 2013.

Version 2.0.2 released in September 2010 added dictation, keyboard shortcuts that also allow custom setups for PC game play, an advanced speech API, and the ability to turn off/on groupings of speech commands. 

Version 2.4 released in November 2011 improved dictation and fixed bugs.

Version 3.0 released in July 2013 eliminated some features including dictation and added features to game play by voice and control of application and programs by voice.

Version 3.2 released in July 2016 introduced support for Microsoft Windows 10 operating system.

Versions

See also
 List of speech recognition software

References

External links

Windows multimedia software
Assistive technology
Proprietary software
Speech recognition software
Computer accessibility
Game accessibility
Educational software